Ophiodes luciae, Lucy’s worm lizard, is a species of lizard of the Diploglossidae family. It is found in Paraguay.

References

Ophiodes
Reptiles described in 2015
Reptiles of Paraguay
Endemic fauna of Paraguay